NCAA Football 10 is a college football video game created by Electronic Arts. It is the successor to NCAA Football 09 in the NCAA Football series. It was released on July 14, 2009 for the Xbox 360, PlayStation 3, PlayStation Portable, and PlayStation 2 consoles. Brian Johnson, Brian Orakpo, Mark Sanchez, and Michael Crabtree were the cover athletes for the game.

Cover
 Former Utah Utes quarterback Brian Johnson is the cover athlete for the PlayStation 3.
 Former Texas Longhorns defensive end Brian Orakpo is the cover athlete for the PlayStation 2.
 Former USC Trojans quarterback Mark Sanchez is the cover athlete for the PlayStation Portable.
 Former Texas Tech Red Raiders wide receiver Michael Crabtree is the cover athlete for the Xbox 360.

TeamBuilder
One of the new additions, TeamBuilder, has a wide range of possible teams that could be made, including teams that reference other games, old college football teams, current and old high school football teams. The website has since been taken down as the link to it now forwards to the Madden website.

Reception

NCAA Football 10 has received mostly positive reviews from critics. IGN praised the multitude of new features in the game although were disappointed about the graphics and audio saying that the game "looks a lot like last year".

See also
 Madden NFL 10

References

External links
 NCAA Football 10 at IGN

2009 video games
PlayStation 3 games
PlayStation 2 games
PlayStation Portable games
Xbox 360 games
College football video games
High school American football video games
Video games developed in Canada
Electronic Arts games
EA Sports games
Sports video games with career mode
North America-exclusive video games
Multiplayer and single-player video games
NCAA video games
Video games developed in the United States